BCI is a bus and coach importer headquartered in Kewdale, Perth, Western Australia. It was established by former Hino dealer Ron Nazzari in 1991 as a small family-run operation. It initially imported buses from Malaysia, both fully assembled and in knocked down form.

In 2006, it moved production to China. In May 2011, BCI opened the 48,000 square metre Xiamen Feng Tai Bus and Coach International factory in Xiamen, Fujian Province, China. It sells buses in Australia, New Zealand and the United States. Although manufactured in China, vehicles carry Australian Vehicle identification numbers.

In 2016, Ensignbus began to sell BCI products in the United Kingdom for the first time, starting with the BCI Enterprise high capacity integral double-decker.

Products

Current

Airporter
Citirider 8
Citirider 12
Citirider E
Classmaster 43
Classmaster 57
Classmaster 65
Classmaster 3-axle
Cruiser 9
Cruiser 12
Enterprise
Excellence
Explorer
Fleetmaster 33
Fleetmaster 43
Fleetmaster 55
Fleetmaster 3-axle
Proma
Proma DX
Proma low-floor

Additionally, BCI market the Mercedes-Benz O500R, O500RF and XBC.

Former
Hino BD186
Hino FD1J
Hino RG197
Hino RG230
Hino RK176
Hino RM260
MotorCoach Australia 3010 series
Mitsubishi Fuso MP218

References

External links

BCI website

Bus manufacturers of Australia
Vehicle manufacturing companies established in 1991
Manufacturing companies based in Perth, Western Australia
1991 establishments in Australia
Australian brands